Delna Jones (born September 4, 1940) is an American politician who served in the Oregon House of Representatives from the 6th district from 1983 to 1993.

References

1940 births
Living people
Republican Party members of the Oregon House of Representatives
Politicians from Phoenix, Arizona